Christina Gabbitas (born 7 December 1967) is an English children's author, poet, storyteller and voiceover artist.  She is best known for her rhyming books.

Gabbitas grew up in Blackburn, Lancashire before moving to Yorkshire as a young adult.  Growing up she loved to read poetry and rhymes.  She started writing after having her own children and particularly focussed on stories which would help them overcome their fears and fears that she had, had as a child.

Career

Felicity Fly Series
In 2012 Gabbitas published her first book Welcome To The World Of Felicity Fly. It uses characters such as a washing machine and a woodlouse to talk about fears children may have in the home.  They are encouraged to not feel alone and that having fears is normal.  This was quickly followed by Felicity Fly Meets Veronica Vac.  Whilst still tackling the subject of childhood fears, this book also focuses on individuals caring and helping one another.  A year later Felicity Fly In The Garden was published this time addressing the subject of pollination.  It was well received.  The fourth book in the series Felicity Fly Meets the Dragon Fruit and Friends came out in early 2015 and takes as its main theme healthy food.

Other publications for children
Gabbitas published a book called Share Some Secrets in November 2014, which highlights the difference between good and troublesome secrets, and encourages children who are being abused to speak out.  It is aimed at five to eight year olds.  The book was endorsed by the NSPCC, placed in their library and distributed through their school service. A percentage of sales from the book go to Barnardo's in their 15th anniversary year for 2016. The book was endorsed by Barnardo's, and also a finalist in the People's Book Prize 2016.

In October 2017 the book was animated by students from Sheffield Hallam University.  The launch was covered by the Guardian  and Gabbitas was interviewed by Radio 5 Live about the book and animation.  In October 2018 Gabbitas was made an Honorary Member of the National Society for the Prevention of Cruelty to Children (NSPCC) Council for her dedication to child protection and her fundraising efforts on behalf of the children's charity. The book continues to raise funds for the charity, as it is featured in their bookshop and Gabbitas has twice run the London marathon in support of the charity, as well as taking part in numerous other events.

Triangular Trev and the Shape Idols, published in October 2016, is a picture rhyming book that teaches children about mathematical terminology with fun.  Gabbitas was interviewed on BBC Radio shortly after the launch of this book and it was well received, including being a finalist in the People's Book Prize, the third year in a row Gabbitas had, had a book in the final.

In 2018, Gabbitas launched a book to raise awareness of plastic pollution in our oceans, entitled Save Us. She followed this up in 2019 with a national rap competition for schools to engage pupils with the subject.

Commissions
Gabbitas has also been commissioned by various organisations to write stories on specific topics or stories to tackle specific issues. In 2019 Gabbitas worked in partnership with York Castle Museum to produce a story featuring some of their toy exhibits. The book was also entered into the People's Book Prize.

In the same year, 2019, Gabbitas was also approached by the Office of the Police and Crime Commissioner for Humberside to write a story about knife crime and county lines to be used as a resource to warn young people about the dangers of being involved. The book, entitled No More Knives,  was launched in 2020 and subsequently turned into an animation, which was showcased at an event in February 2021.

During the COVID-19 pandemic in the United Kingdom of 2020/21, Gabbitas was commissioned by Blackburn Business Improvement District (BID) to write a story about her home town to help promote the town during the difficulties of the pandemic.

Poetry
Poetry has always been important to Gabbitas.  2013 saw her launch a new eight line rhyme initiative, which had the backing of the then education secretary Michael Gove. The initiative takes the form of a yearly competition with children of primary school age encouraged to write poems on a particular topic, which are then judged by a panel of judges that includes the former Ambassador and the official Entrepreneur in Residence at The Business & Intellectual Property Centre at The British Library Dr Stephen Fear.  The best poems are published in a book in the autumn of each year.  Topics have included teamwork and friendship, healthy eating and music.  Gabbitas also met Fear on World Book Day 2015, where she was interviewed at the British Library about her books.

Gabbitas launched a further initiative in 2020 during the COVID-19 pandemic in the United Kingdom to encourage children and school staff to write poetry.  The initiative was backed by actress Jenny Agutter and the winning poems were published in a book in autumn 2020.

In both 2015 and 2016 Gabbitas was invited to attend the Sharjah Children's Reading Festival in the United Arab Emirates where she held storytelling and poetry workshops, and promoted the eight line rhyme initiative.

Awards
Felicity Fly meets Veronica Vac was voted into the final of the People's Book Prize 2014. 
The second volume of poetry published from the eight line rhyme initiative in September 2014 gained Gabbitas the Dame Beryl Bainbridge First Time Author Award at The People's Book Prize at a ceremony in London in 2015. The book takes creatures and food as its themes.

In 2016 Gabbitas received the Sue Ryder Yorkshire Women of Achievement award in education for encouraging and making an impact educating children through her work.

Gabbitas received a further award in May 2019 when her book Share Some Secrets won the Best Achievement category in the People's Book Prize.

Charity work 
Gabbitas is a trustee of the Children's Literature Festival charity, which she set up. Its patrons include award-winning actress Jenny Agutter and Michael Bradley (musician) of band The Undertones. The charity holds free literature festivals for children and families in places including Blackburn and Selby. As part of the 2019 Blackburn festival, Gabbitas also worked with the Ribble Rivers Trust to hold a poetry competition as part of the schools' festival.

References

External links

Official website
Official website of the Felicity Fly series
Official website of Share Some Secrets
Official website of Triangular Trev and the Shape Idols
Official website for eight line rhyme competition

1967 births
Living people
English women writers
People from Blackburn
English children's writers